Strong (stylized on-screen as S.T.R.O.N.G.) was an  American competition reality show that debuted on NBC on April 13, 2016 and aired on Thursdays at 8 p.m. It was hosted by former professional volleyball player Gabrielle Reece.

Premise
Strong features 20 contestants, which include 10 male trainers and 10 female trainees. The trainers work on helping their trainees improve their physical fitness, not only through losing weight but, according to the series, "achieving a balance between mind and body, and getting into shape both physically and mentally". In each episode, the team will train together and compete in physical challenges involving a wide range of disciplines and activities, including mixed martial arts, strength and endurance training, and boxing. After a series of challenges, two teams will face each other in a physical competition in the Elimination Tower, with the losing team being eliminated from the series. The winning team will receive a cash prize of up to $500,000, depending on their overall performance in the show.

Contestants
The season one contestants for Strong include:

Trainers
Leyon Azubuike (33), a professional strength and condition coach from Santa Monica, California
Todd Durkin (44), a personal trainer and author from San Diego
Ky Evans (43), a personal trainer and ballet dancer from Marina del Rey, California
Drew Logan (41), a celebrity trainer and nutrition expert from Manhattan Beach, California
Mathew Miller (34), a strength and conditioning coach from Las Vegas
Wesley Okerson (37), a personal trainer from Los Angeles
Adam Von Rothfelder (33), a strength trainer and former MMA fighter from Milwaukee
Chris Ryan (35), a personal trainer and fitness model from New York City
Dan Wells (41), a gym franchise owner from Studio City, Los Angeles
Bennie Wylie (39), a strength and conditioning trainer from Tuscola, Texas

Trainees
Brittany Harrell-Miller (26), algebra teacher from Lawrence, Kansas
Jill May, mother from Minnesota

Teams

 The team won Strong.
 The team was the runner-up of Strong.
 The team won the power challenge and sent someone to the elimination tower.
 The team came in last in the medallion challenge, but saved themselves by winning the power challenge and chose two teams to compete in the elimination tower.
 The team won the medallion challenge and gained immunity for the week. Starting Week 5, the Power Challenge and the Medallion Challenge was merged into the Ultimate Challenge. The winner of the Ultimate Challenge gets to choose one team to compete in the elimination tower against the last place finisher.
 The contestant won entry back into the competition.
 The contestant came back for a chance to win re-entry into the competition, lost, and was eliminated again.
 The team was sent to the elimination tower by the winning team, but was not eliminated.
  The team lost the medallion challenge, was sent to the elimination tower, and was not eliminated.
 The team was sent to the elimination tower by the winning team, and was eliminated. 
 The team lost the medallion challenge, was sent to the elimination tower, and was eliminated.

Team Medallions

Production
Executive producers for Strong include Dave Broome, creator of the competition reality series The Biggest Loser and Holly Wofford, a producer with the sports competition show American Ninja Warrior. Other executive producers include Sylvester Stallone and Kevin King-Templeton, both of whom also collaborated on the sports drama film Creed (2015). The series is being produced by Sony Pictures Television in association with 25/7 Productions.

Paul Telegdy, NBC president of alternative and late-night programming, said American Ninja Warrior prompted interest in Strong, and that pitches for shows were considered around the question: "If there was a show that would get people ready to be a contestant on American Ninja Warrior, what would it be?" Host Gabrielle Reece said the show's physical challenges are a "high level of difficulty" and said of the series: "I think it has a really human quality to it. The cast's stories are stories that everyone can relate to."

The show debuted with back-to-back episodes during a sneak preview on April 13, 2016, before the show moves into its regular timeslot of Thursday at 8 p.m. The sneak preview followed a live episode of the NBC musical competition series The Voice. It precedes The Blacklist in the NBC schedule. Strong is the third show to air in NBC's Thursday 8 p.m. timeslot this season, along with Heroes Reborn and You, Me and the Apocalypse. According to The Hollywood Reporter, the title Strong is an acronym for "Start to Realize Our Natural Greatness".

Episodes

References

External links

2016 American television series debuts
2016 American television series endings
2010s American reality television series
English-language television shows
Fitness reality television series
NBC original programming
Television series by Sony Pictures Television
Reality competition television series